The Sounds Live Feels Live World Tour was the second headlining concert tour by Australian pop rock band 5 Seconds of Summer, in support of their second studio album, Sounds Good Feels Good. The tour started on February 19, 2016 in Nagoya, Japan at the Nagoya Congress Center and concluded on October 5, 2016 in Sydney, Australia at the Hordern Pavilion. The tour's title is in reference to 5 Seconds of Summer's 2015 album.

Background
In October 2015, the band announced the European headlining dates, and later followed this up with announcements for both Asia and North America. The 101 dates announced represented a sizable increase from their debut tour a year earlier, primarily due to the addition of the Asian leg as well as new venues in Europe, the United States and Mexico. However, the band halved its Canadian appearances to only two shows; the band would not be revisiting any cities in Western Canada.

Reception
The tour was met with generally favorable reviews. Sugarscape.com awarded the show five stars out of five; writing "We're not even sure how they manage it, but these boys sound better *and* feel better every time we see 'em.". Kathy McCabe from The Daily Telegraph wrote: "The screams [of their fans] hurt your ears, the songs don’t; their infectious pop hooks, three-part vocals and Irwin's propulsive rhythms and energetic performance inciting you to move."

The tour made $39 million in ticket sales.

Setlist
This set list is representative of the performance on 15 July 2016 at Madison Square Garden in New York City, New York. It does not represent the set list at all concerts for the duration of the tour.

"Carry On"
"Hey Everybody!"
"Money"
"Voodoo Doll"
"Don't Stop"
"Disconnected"
"Long Way Home"
"Outer Space"
"Waste the Night"
"Vapor"

"Amnesia"
"Castaway"
"Jet Black Heart"
"End Up Here"
"Good Girls"
"Girls Talk Boys"
"Permanent Vacation"
"What I Like About You"
Encore
"She's Kinda Hot"
"She Looks So Perfect"

Tour dates
List of concerts, showing date, city, country, venue, opening act, tickets sold, number of available tickets and amount of gross revenue.

References

2016 concert tours
5 Seconds of Summer concert tours
Concert tours of Japan
Concert tours of China
Concert tours of Taiwan
Concert tours of Malaysia
Concert tours of Singapore
Concert tours of Indonesia
Concert tours of Thailand
Concert tours of Hong Kong
Concert tours of the Philippines
Concert tours of the United Kingdom
Concert tours of Ireland
Concert tours of Austria
Concert tours of Italy
Concert tours of Germany
Concert tours of France
Concert tours of Belgium
Concert tours of the Netherlands
Concert tours of Denmark
Concert tours of Norway
Concert tours of Sweden
Concert tours of Finland
Concert tours of Estonia
Concert tours of Spain
Concert tours of the United States
Concert tours of Canada
Concert tours of Mexico
Concert tours of Australia